Pass Labs is a high-end-audio company based in Auburn, California, United States founded by Nelson Pass, a well-known figure in the high-end audio community. The company was founded in 1991.

Pass founded, and worked at, audio company Threshold, where he developed the Stasis series of amplifiers. These designs were later licensed to Nakamichi.

The Pass labs Aleph series of amplifiers operated pure class A and contained internal circuitry using MOSFETs. The Aleph amplifiers had a unique appearance, a cube with heat sinks on all four sides, a practical solution to the heat generated by the class-A design.

After the Aleph series of amplifiers was discontinued, a separate entity Volksamp was licensed to continue to produce a similar product. Aleph 30 and 60 Amplifiers were made by Volksamp until production ceased in 2003.

Manufacture of the Aleph series of amplifiers is to be continued by First Watt, an amplifier company founded by Nelson Pass in 2004.  First Watt initially produced power trans-conductance amplifiers (or technically a power current source). These current domain amplifiers are only suitable for use with certain types of speakers. With respect to the Aleph amplifier line, First Watt has announced plans for the Aleph J, a revision of the famous Pass Labs Aleph 3/Volksamp Aleph 30 wherein a new JFET input stage is to be added.

Today Pass Labs makes amplifiers, preamplifier and speakers. Pass Labs is also a supporter of the DIY audio community and maintains an internet presence for this purpose.

Current Pass Labs "X" series amplifiers use a distortion canceling balanced audio signal circuit.

References

External links 
 First Watt website
 Pass Labs website

Audio amplifier manufacturers
Audio equipment manufacturers of the United States
Manufacturing companies based in California
1991 establishments in California
Electronics companies established in 1991